Fotbal Club Progresul București, commonly known as Progresul București or simply as Progresul, was a Romanian football club based in Bucharest.

The team was founded in 1944 as B.N.R. București, being the team of the National Bank of Romania (B.N.R.). In 1947 B.N.R. has promoted to Divizia B, then after only seven years made its debut in the Divizia A, this time under the name of Progresul Finanțe Bănci București. The road of Progresul through Romanian football has been marked with ups and downs, in total spending no less than 32 seasons in the top flight, being ranked 15th in the Liga I All-Time Table. "The Bankers" were runners-up of the league for three times (1995–96, 1996–97, 2001–02), won the Romanian Cup in the 1959–60 season and was also the finalist of the competition on four other occasions (1957–58, 1996–97, 2002–03, 2005–06).

Life in the shadow of the big three teams of Bucharest and Romania, Steaua, Dinamo and Rapid was not easy for "the bleu and blues", but the lack of support by the communist regime ensured the sympathy of many supporters, a big part of them were actors, artists and people from the little bourgeoisie, the elite of Bucharest.

In April 2009 due to financial problems, Progresul was kicked out from the Cotroceni Stadium by its first owner, National Bank of Romania, which was no longer part of the club, but was still the owner of the stadium. In the same month, the club was excluded from the Liga II and declared bankrupt.

One of Romania's most well known footballers Dan Petrescu finished his career at the club.

History

Founding, early years and the biggest success (1944–1970)

FC Progresul București was founded as B.N.R. București on 10 May 1944 at the initiative of Nicolae Pop Sr. and Traian Pătrașcu, who, during a meeting host by I. Vidrighin Hotel in Rășinari, have proposed to the audience made up of the staff of the National Bank of Romania, the creation of a football team which would represent the institution. The idea was quickly embraced by those present, the club was founded, but no formal act of constitution was signed, problem that was solved many years later, somewhat informally by writer Valentin Căltuț who created an act of constitution based on the confessions of Nicolae Pop Jr. (son of Nicolae Pop Sr.) and some founding members as Petre Lambru, Iosif Micu, Petre Mihăilescu, Ernest Rădulescu and Constantin Stoian.

After only two seasons spent in the third tier, "the Bankers" promoted to Divizia B at the end of the 1946–47 edition, being ranked 8th of 16 at the end of their inaugural season. In the summer of 1948 B.N.R. București was renamed as Banca de Stat București, then one year later was renamed again as Spartac București. 1955 was the first season spent by "the bleu and blues" on the first stage of Romanian football and coincided with good results and a nice style of playing that left a good impression to the football fans, who started to come in a growing number to the team's matches. By approaching the championship with an only well-known player (Titus Ozon) who co-ordinated a group of unknown players at that time, the team was ranked 3rd of 13, in front of important clubs such as CCA București or Știința Cluj. Titus Ozon's name is related to all "the barbers" important results from the 1950s (1955 – 3rd, 1956 – 9th and 1957–58 – 4th). The squad of Progresul in the first season of Divizia A was composed of: Popovici, Gică Andrei, Bratu, Paraschiv, Soare, Colosi, Ciocea, Banciu, Cosma, Știrbei, Cacoveanu, Fusulan, Dragomir, Dobrescu, Cruțiu, M. Smărăndescu, Tănase, Mihăilescu, E. Iordache and Ioan Lupaș (head coach).

In the summer of 1958 several of the prominent players left the team: first Ozon, then Moldoveanu, Dinulescu and Cojocaru. On the other hand, some new players came: Maior, Nedelcu, Nicu Smărăndescu, Ioniță, Baboie, Mafteuță, Marin, Birn or Vasilescu. In the 1958–59 season the team was ranked 6th and reached the semi-finals of the Romanian Cup, there Progresul missed the chance to play the final, losing the match against Baia Mare with 1–2. The second semi-final took place between Dinamo București and Rapid București (5-3), in which Ozon was at his first game for the team based in Giulești, after a one-year career break.

In the 1959–60 season, the team was ranked 9th with a squad led by international players such as Mândru, Karikaș, Soare and Oaidă, Progresul conquered the Romanian Cup, achieving a great performance: 15 goals scored and only one conceded. The final held by Republicii Stadium was played in front of 30,000 spectators between Progresul and Dinamo Obor and was dominated by the team from the Sycamore Park, which goals were scored by Oaidă and Soare. The squad that brought the first cup on Dr. Staicovici street was composed of: Mândru – Nicu Smărăndescu, Karikaș, Soare – Ioniță, Maior – Oaidă, Mafteuță, Marin, Mișu Smărăndescu and Protopopescu.

In the 1960–61 championship edition, "the bankers" were ranked 9th, as in the previous one and in the Cup they reached the quarter-finals, where were eliminated by Steaua. Next seasons, "the bleu and blues" finished on the following positions: (1961–62 – 3rd, 1962–63 – 9th and 1963–64 – 4th), before ending the last at the end of the 1964–65 season and relegating to the second division.

With a valuable squad, the team was expected to return to the first division immediately and after a close battle against Știința București, they confirmed the expectations. The promotion was decided in the final round when for Progresul entered in the first eleven, players such as Mateianu, Mândru, Oaidă, Baboie, Unguroiu, Colceriu, Adrian Constantinescu or Mafteuță. In the first season after promotion, "the barbers" ended on the 10th position, then almost relegated again after finishing 13th out of 14 at the end of the 1967–68 season. This place sent the team to the promotion/relegation play-off where together with Crișul Oradea qualified for the next season of Divizia A, to the detriment of Steagul Roșu Brașov and Politehnica Galați. The weak form of "the Knights of the Sycamore Leaf" led them to relegation also in the next season, finishing only 15th out of 16, but the team was still too good for the second tier and promoted back after only one season, starting the 1970s as a Divizia A member.

Ups and downs, the years of exile (1970–1990)
After the first rounds of the new season, another great player of the team, Viorel Mateianu, retired from its professional career, on the other hand, Raksi, Pavlovici and Dudu Georgescu made their debut in the first squad, Dudu Georgescu would become later the European Golden Shoe. Despite the fact that during the second part of the 1970–71 season Progresul used one of the most talented teams in its history, with a middle line formed of Kassai (known at that time as Dumitru IV) and Beldeanu, a forward line composed of Sandu Ion, Dudu Georgescu, Mircea Sandu and Viorel Năstase, both supported by a defensive which had in its composition players as Tănăsescu or Filipescu, the weak results from autumn sentenced them to relegation.

After relegation the squad disbanded, Mircea Sandu and Viorel Năstase were transferred in the summer, then even that at the end of the season the team took the second place in the series, right behind Sportul Studențesc, shortly after, Paul Manta, Adalbert Kassai, Nicolae Tănăsescu, Gabriel Raksi and Aurel Beldeanu also left the club. In the 1972–73 edition, the team was ranked as a middle-table squad of the second tier. "The bankers" will promote to Divizia A only 1976, after another three seasons spent in the second division. The joy of promotion was a short one, because, after a season spent in the top flight, Progresul relegated again in 1977, after finishing only 17th out of 18. The inconstancy of the team continued in the next period, especially due to some financial problems combined with the youthfulness of the first team, and after two mediocre campaigns "the bleu and blues" promoted again in the summer of 1980, this time under the name of Progresul Vulcan București finishing at only two points ahead of Rapid București.

The 1980s started with a tough season for Progresul, which managed to maintain in the first division by having a better goal difference than Politehnica Iași, after scoring a goal at the end of the last day of the season. Remarkable were also the victories against Steaua (1-0) and Universitatea Craiova (3-2). In the following championship, Progresul relegated, along with Universitatea Cluj and UTA Arad. In the 1980s, teams such as FC Olt Scornicești, Flacăra Moreni and Victoria București appeared on the first stage of Romanian football. The management of the club tried to replace Viorel Mateianu, who has returned to the team after the successful experiment from Baia Mare, with Robert Cosmoc. The results were unsatisfactory and in the spring, the team reached the 10th place. Distinguished journalist Radu Cosașu, a sympathizer of "the bankers", wrote about this period: "Throughout these years, Progresul has strengthened me through suffering."

The decade continued in a bad rhythm for the team from the Sycamore Park which didn't manage to promote in the first league for six years, in which it finished on the following positions: 1983–84 – 10th, 1984–85 – 3rd, 1985–86 – 2nd, 1986–87 – 2nd. After three seasons in which Progresul fought for promotion, the lack of success and of an own stadium, after the decision to decommission the Dr. Staicovici Stadium, led the club in a state of demoralization and by playing its home matches on more than six different stadiums (Autobuzul, Giulești, ICSIM, Mecanica Fină, Metalul, 23 August, Voința, etc.) has only accentuated this state.

The 1987–88 season was a disastrous one, one of the darkest in the history of the club. During this season Progresul managed to collect only 14 points, head coach Paul Popescu resigned and left the club, where due to the precarious situation many coaches will be changed: Marin Moraru and Vasile Aelenei (in the first part of the season), Costică Toma and Adrian Rusu (in the second part of the season) and finally Nicolae Lupescu. Twelve players left the Sycamore Park, in their place arriving at least twenty-five, many of them have been promoted from the youth squads, or have returned after completing the military service. Very few of them succeed in the first squad, among the valuable players were Liviu Ciobotariu, Cristian Diaconu, Carol Marina and Valentin Oprea, who have evolved here for five consecutive years, eventually contributing to the return of Progresul in the first division. The series of Divizia B was won in that season by Inter Sibiu; at the other pole of the league – Progresul Vulcan, which after 40 years, relegated to the lower leagues of the Romanian football.

Next season, first in the Divizia C after 40 years, was started under the name of Progresul Energia București, with a new chairman, Dan Ionescu, and a new manager, the well-known Paul Popescu. The club from Dr. Staicovici street also reduced the size of the squad, from 38 to 24 players, but unfortunately at the end of the season was ranked only 2nd in its series, after Mecanică Fină București. During the 1989–90 season, the events were going to take a happy turn for "the barbers", the Romanian Revolution has meant changing the situation in the organization of the National Bank of Romania. With the prestigious institution on his side, with Gheorghe Cristoloveanu as the manager and a squad in which the young striker Florin Cârstea will make its debut with style, Progresul won its series with five points ahead second place, Metalul București and promoted back in the second division after two tough seasons. The first season after the promotion was not a great one for "the bleu and blues" who finished only 14th in the second series, but as a plus, Tinel Petre made its debut for the first squad.

Back home, the most beautiful years (1990–2000) - FC Național București

Simultaneously with the start of the 1991–92 season, the club returned, after 14 years, to the old name of Progresul București, without further additions such as Vulcan, Energia or Șoimii, and with the National Bank as the main sponsor. Vlad Soare, back then, deputy governor of the National Bank, took over the club's destiny and the beneficial effects started to be seen immediately. A few valuable players are brought in to cover up the "suffering" positions; as manager was named Vasile Simionaș, Dumitru Ștefan as assistant manager, finally a long-term program being implemented. Progresul started well the season, but the second part was announced to be more difficult, as Gloria CFR Galați was also in the fight for the first place, threatening "the bankers" with an impressive comeback. Finally "the barbers" promoted with a total of 47 points, returning on the first stage of the Romanian football league system after 10 years.

After a tough first season, in which "the Knights of the Sycamore Leaf" were ranked only 15th out of 18, the team started to grow in value, and with it, also the results. During the 1993–94 season Simionaș left the club, but in his place appeared three important coaches: Jackie Ionescu, Viorel Kraus and Gelu Cristoloveanu. Players such as Cârstea, Liță, Tinel Petre, Potocianu or Luțu made their debut for Romania national football team. From an administrative point of view, Cornel Dinu was named as chairman of SC Progresul SA, entity which aimed to bring the team of the National Bank to European standards. Progresul displayed a good football, finishing 9th at the end of the season, far away from the relegation worries.

Middle of the 1990s was probably the best period in the history of "the bankers", but at least the best since the end of the 1950s. In the summer of 1994, Progresul was renamed again, this time as FC Național București and Honorary president was named Ilie Năstase. At 50 years since the foundation of the National Bank of Romania, the team led from the bench by Liță Dumitru had an impressive start of the season by defeating Petrolul Ploiești 4–1, Universitatea Craiova 3-2 and Gloria Bistrița 3-1 (at home); Oțelul Galați 5–2, UTA Arad and FC Argeș Pitești 3-0 (away). However, Progresul lost 0–6 in Ghencea, but entered in the winter break as the leader of the first division. First seven rounds of the second part of the season were very weak and Progresul recorded five defeats and two draws. Liță Dumitru was sacked and replaced by Viorel Hizo, who had been recently sacked by Rapid. "The bankers" ended the championship in the 6th position and was believed by the majority of supporters that Cornel Dinu's departure to Dinamo contributed to the drop in form. The chairman of the club became, the former player of the team, Gino Iorgulescu and Marin Dună was very close of being the goalscorer of the Romanian championship, ending on the third position of the podium.

From the first round of the 1995–96 season FC Național was able to evolve on the recently built Cotroceni Stadium, which benefited of covered stands, electronic scoreboard and modern floodlights. Next, to the stadium, a new gym and a micro-hotel, as well as a tennis complex, were built. Thus, at almost 10 years after the closing down of Dr. Staicovici Stadium, "the bankers" could play again their home matches in the Sycamore Park. The move was auspicious, so, at the end of the first part of the season, Progresul was ranked 6th, although the start was not too good, "the bleu and blues" being the last after seven rounds, but the new coach Florin Halagian and Gino Iorgulescu's management have recovered the situation.

Day of 20 April 1996 remained permanently in the memory of the supporters, who at the end of the game which was played on the Cotroceni Stadium against FC Brașov chanted happily: "Vice-champions, vice-champions!". The team climbed up from the middle of the table up to the second place, from a 6-17 goal difference to an unbelievable 60-44 and 60 points. Team's captain, Marin Dună, ranked second in the top scorer's table with 17 goals scored, being overtaken only by Ion Vlădoiu, credited with 25. Dună also appeared ranked second in the table made by Radio România Actualități to designate the best footballer of that year, the winner was in the final Adrian Ilie.

1996–97 season started with a UEFA Cup adventure for "the barbers" who were eliminated in the third preliminary round by Club Brugge, 1–3 on aggregate, not before eliminating teams like Chornomorets Odesa and FK Partizan. 1997 was another outstanding year for FC Național which was ranked again 2nd, after a hand-to-hand combat against Steaua București, also reaching the Romanian Cup Final, where they lost 2–4, this time against Rapid București, at the end of a spectacular match.

After two great seasons, "the bankers" remained for the next years in the first part of the table, but they slipped slightly down: 1997–98 – 5th, 1998–99 – 7th and 1999–2000 – 9th.

The last performances and an unexpected relegation (2000–2009)
After a 7th place obtained at the end of the 2000–01 season, FC Național started the 2001–02 edition of Divizia A with a new ownership and new hopes to repeat the performances achieved in the middle of the last decade. On 17 July 2001 in the Sycamore Park entered Mugdin Hadzibegović, a Bosnian businessman willing to buy 60% of the club's shares. Iorgulescu stepped aside and Cosmin Olăroiu became the general manager of the club, but as no one tried to verify the Bosnian's creditworthiness, the financial problems seemed to be even higher than before. On 23 August, 15 players have announced their departure and the situation look very bad, but a Balkan business was resolved in the Romanian style, next day the executive committee of the Romanian Football Federation withdrew Hadzibegović license and the team went back to its old formula, Gino Iorgulescu president and Cosmin Olăroiu manager.

Even if Dinamo had eight points ahead after 20 rounds, from nowhere, totally unexpected, came FC Național. Without the pressure of the supporters, with an elegant stadium and an experienced squad which included players such as Cristian Munteanu, Bogdan Vintilă, Corneliu Papură, Adrian Matei, Dan Potocianu, Gabriel Popescu or Radu Niculescu, among others, "the bankers" were in the top of the league with one point ahead of Dinamo, just before the last day of the season. In the last round, Dinamo won 4–0 against FC Brașov while FC Național was needing a victory on the Ion Oblemenco Stadium, against Universitatea Craiova, in front of 30,000 fans. When things seemed unsolvable for "the Knights of the Sycamore Leaf", a memorable thing happened, Universitatea Craiova fans, well known as being very proud of their team and good connoisseurs of football, started to cheer for "the bankers", thing possible due to bitter rivalry between Craiova and Dinamo, but also due to the fact that many players of the team would leave Craiova for Dinamo, just after the last round, fact that deeply dissatisfied the home fans. In front of the biggest crowd that supported them ever, FC Național lost 1-2 and Craiova players sent the title to their future team, Dinamo.

2002–03 season started with another participation in the UEFA Cup and as in 1996 "the bleu and blues" touched the same third preliminary round where they were eliminated by Paris Saint-Germain, 0–3 on aggregate. In the first two rounds, they eliminated with 3–2 on aggregate, firstly KF Tirana, then Heerenveen.

The last European participation (until now) was followed by mediocre season and in generally middle-table positions (2002–03 – 8th, 2003–04 – 7th, 2005–06 – 6th), but with three peaks, a 4th place at the end of the 2004–05 season and two Romanian Cup finals, in 2003 and 2006, both lost 0–1 against Dinamo București and Rapid București.

After a summer that brought important names to the Sycamore Park, such as Cătălin Cursaru, Erik Lincar, Claudiu Drăgan, Florentin Dumitru and others, "the bankers" proposed for the new season the 3rd place. The new coach, Marin Dună, former player and a legend of the club, had the trust of everyone, including the supporters. Another one was the destiny of the "Knights of the Sycamore Leaf", with many consecutive defeats and only two wins in the autumn, Marin Dună was sacked and Ion Vlădoiu was appointed as the new manager. He obtained the qualification in the quarter-finals of the Romanian Cup, in front of FCM Bacau, then he was also replaced, by Liviu Ciobotariu. Sorin Cârțu, an experienced coach was brought during the winter break and the team seemed to have recovered their motivation, losing to Dinamo away, score 0–1, with a goal scored hardly by Ionel Ganea, only in the 90th minute. However, the series of consecutive defeats continued for "the bankers" and Cârțu resigned. Eugen Nae's interim did not solve the situation and FC Național could not avoid relegation, finally finishing in 16th place.

In the summer of 2007, after relegation, FC Național was renamed again as Progresul București, the general manager became Cristian Munteanu, Corneliu Papură was appointed as the new manager and Basarab Panduru as the new technical director. The struggle from the technical bench brought the team in the red zone, Dennis Șerban, Basarab Panduru and then Marius Șumudică were successively named as managers, the last one saving the team from a shameful relegation to Liga III.

The team was ranked second at the end of the first part of the 2008–09 season, under the command of the same Marius Șumudică, but then "the bleu and blues" have not been scheduled for two rounds in a row, 23 (against Dunărea Giurgiu) and 24 (against Concordia Chiajna) being excluded by Romanian Football Federation from the second tier and later being declared bankrupt. In 2008 the club was also evacuated from the Cotroceni Stadium because of its debts to the National Bank of Romania, owner of the complex, founder and former owner of the club, also.

After the bankruptcy of FC Progresul (2009–present)
On 11 August 2009 AS Progresul București was founded and enrolled in the fourth tier of the Romanian football league system. Tudor Iacov, brother of Constantin Iacov, the last president of the club in the second tier, was named the new chairman, the supporters immediately came back and even if the brand of the old club has been lost, AS Progresul București considered itself as the successor of the previous entity SC FC Progresul SA, although legally it was not.

In the summer of 2014 due to financial precarious situation and tensions that occurred in the AS Progresul București club, Andrei Erimia, coach of a youth squad, took its team and supported financially by Gabriel Rădulescu, founded on 14 June 2014 a new club, AFC Progresul Spartac 1944 București. The new entity does not claim the record, logo or the succession of the old entity (FC Progresul), despite the fact that it uses some elements of the original brand (bleu and blue colors; the sycamore leaf), called itself "direct descendant of Progresul București" and its objective is "to revive the spirit of Progresul from Cotroceni". Also, the name of the new club is a combination of names "Progresul" (the most used name of the old club), "Spartac" (name used by FC Progresul between 1950 and 1954) and "1944" (foundation year of the original entity).

In this complicated situation AS Progresul won unexpectedly Liga IV, Bucharest Series and qualified for 2015–16 promotion play-off, but unfortunately made two very weak legs and lost 1–6 on aggregate against Arsenal Malu, Giurgiu County champions.

In the summer of 2015, another wing of the club split up from AS Progresul, the new entity called CS Progresul 2005 chose to start his own way, but the heavy blow was given by fans, which chose to support Progresul Spartac instead of AS Progresul. Despite the tough situation, AS Progresul made another good season and qualified for the Bucharest series promotion play-off, where it had a tough duel against Progresul Spartac București, the club that chose to separate in 2014. The matches between the two clubs took place both on the ground, in the committees and in the press, accusing each other of various irregularities. At the end of the play-off AS Progresul was ranked second, Progresul Spartac won and qualified for the Liga III promotion play-off where after a spectacular 6–5 on aggregate (but not without problems) against Voința Crevedia, promoted to Liga III.

In the summer of 2017 due to lack of funding, of a proper stadium, after the double split (from 2014 and 2015), in conflict with the leadership of the Bucharest Football Association and abandoned by its own fans, AS Progresul decided to withdraw from Liga IV and subsequently was dissolved. Progresul Spartac București it's currently playing in the Liga III, while CS Progresul 2005 is still in the 4th tier.

In conclusion, after the bankruptcy of the original club, FC Progresul, three new entities were established during the 2010s, AS Progresul (which was dissolved in 2017), CS Progresul 2005 (which is playing in the 4th tier) and Progresul Spartac București (which is playing in the third tier and has FC Progresul supporters by its side). From a legal point of view, no one is the official successor of the old club, FC Progresul.

Grounds

Stadionul Dr. Staicovici

Founded on 10 May 1944 at Rășinari, where National Bank of Romania moved its headquarter during the World War II, Progresul started to play in Bucharest after the end of the conflagration. Dr. Staicovici Stadium, with a capacity of 8,000 seats, situated on the street with the same name, right in the center of the capital, became the home ground of "the barbers" for more than 40 years until September 1986 when it was decided to close and decommission the sports complex.

Stadionul Cotroceni

In 1995, after almost 10 years of exile, Progresul returned home, this time on the newly built Cotroceni Stadium. The first stadium built after the Romanian Revolution of 1989 was a "jewel" for those times, with a capacity of 14,542 seats it was benefiting of covered stands, electronic scoreboard and modern floodlights. Next, to the stadium, a new gym and a micro-hotel, as well as a tennis complex, were built. The stadium is located in the same zone as the old Dr. Staicovici Stadium was, in the downtown of the city, more precisely in the Sycamore Park (Parcul cu Platani), close to the Palace of the Parliament, Ministry of National Defence and Arenele BNR. In early 2009 Progresul was evacuated from the Cotroceni Stadium because of its debts to the National Bank of Romania, owner of the complex, founder and former owner of the club, also. Now, the sports complex is in a rather poor state, after 10 years in which the stadium was only used for a few championships of oină.

Others
Progresul was almost 10 years in exile, the first period was between 1986 and 1995 and as the home ground have served many stadiums from Bucharest, among them: Autobuzul, Giulești, ICSIM, Mecanica Fină, Metalul, 23 August or Voința. The second period started in 2009 after the bankruptcy of SC FC Progresul SA and the newly formed AS FC Progresul has been forced for years to evolve on various stadiums, most of them in a rather poor state. Some of the football grounds used in the 2010s were Coresi, Viitorul, Granitul and Prefabricate. Prefabricate Stadium located in the "Sparrow's entry" was bought in 2015 by Progresul Spartac, renovated and renamed as Progresul Spartac Stadium.

Support
Progresul was from the beginning a team with an anti-communist fragrance which ensured itself mainly the sympathy of supporters that did not manage to associate themselves with the idea of the Red Army or KGB, a big part of them were actors, artists and people from the little bourgeoisie, the elite of Bucharest. Despite the fact that it was repeatedly relegated, the love of supporters remained constant even though the greatest rewards in that period were the returns to the first division. The home games of the 1970s and 1980s meant at least 6–7,000 people in the stands.

The year 1986 can be considered the moment when a part of Progresul's spirit died. From that year Dr. Staicovici Stadium hosted Victoria București matches. Securitate's team fell in love with the arena, so much that they thought about taking it with them. Former player, Dumitru Bolborea remembered: "No one expected that. They came with a trailer, some of them were cutting the stands with the welding machines and others were carrying them." In exile for the next years, on the Voința Stadium, IMGB, ICSIM or Automatica, the club was weakened and relegated to the third tier. At the beginning of the pilgrimage loyalty remained constant, the same Progresul brought 5–6,000 spectators in the Divizia C. Over time, the number of supporters decreased, the years of exile leaving deep traces. Valentin Caltuț: "Think about having to play nine years away (between 1986 and 1995 when the Cotroceni Stadium was rebuilt). How do you make a kid stay with this team?". After 1995 the supporters were not so many, some of them were nostalgic, but in 2003 a new active group came at the initiative of the young generation, the group was named "F.A.N.S".

Progresul supporters consider FC Argeș Pitești supporters to be their allies, fans of both teams had the opportunity to support the other during matches.

Rivalries
Progresul has been a sympathized team over time, with only a few supporters, but very civilized, the club left in general a good impression, not generating notable antipathies. Main rivals of Progresul were from Bucharest, before 1989, teams backed by the communist regime, such as Steaua, Dinamo and Victoria. After that, rivalries against Steaua and Dinamo remained, but were of low intensity as the one against Sportul Studențesc, a sporty derby between the smallest teams from capital which had constant presences in the Liga I.

Honours

Domestic

Leagues
Liga I
Runners-up (3): 1995–96, 1996–97, 2001–02
Liga II
Winners (6): 1954, 1965–66, 1969–70, 1975–76, 1979–80, 1991–92
Runners-up (5): 1953, 1971–72, 1974–75, 1985–86, 1986–87
Liga III
Winners (2): 1946–47, 1989–90
Runners-up (1): 1988–89
Liga IV – Bucharest
Winners (1): 2015–16

Cups
Cupa României
Winners (1): 1959–60
Runners-up (4): 1957–58, 1996–97, 2002–03, 2005–06

Other performances
Appearances in Liga I: 32
Best finish in Liga I: 2nd place in 1995–96, 1996–97 and 2001–02.
Place 15 of 101 teams in Liga I All-time table

European record

Notable former players
The footballers enlisted below have had international cap(s) for their respective countries at junior and/or senior level and/or more than 100 caps for FC Progresul București.

Romania
  Cristian Albeanu
  Florea Birtașu
  Aurel Beldeanu
  Stelian Carabaș
  Gabriel Caramarin
  Florin Cârstea
  Liviu Ciobotariu
  Daniel Ciucă
  Marius Ciugarin
  Gigel Coman
  Tudorel Cristea
  Tiberiu Curt
  Constantin Dinulescu
  Marin Dragnea
  Florentin Dumitru
  Marin Dună
  Adrian Falub
  Constantin Gâlcă
  Dudu Georgescu
  Nicolae Georgescu
  Daniel Ghindeanu
  Ilie Greavu
  Ovidiu Hanganu
  Ovidiu Herea
  Sabin Ilie
  Gino Iorgulescu

Romania
  Alexandru Karikaș
  Marius Lăcătuș
  Erik Lincar
  Cătălin Liță
  Ioan Lupaș
  Ionuț Luțu
  Petre Marin
  Petre Mândru
  Constantin Marinescu
  Ion Mateescu
  Adrian Matei
  Viorel Mateianu
  Vasile Mihăilescu
  Cornel Mirea
  Dănuț Moisescu
  Flavius Moldovan
  Petre Moldoveanu
  Cristian Munteanu
  Viorel Năstase
  Cătălin Necula
  Radu Niculescu
  Nicolae Oaidă
  Adrian Olah
  Titus Ozon
  Mihai Panc

Romania
  Cornel Pavlovici
  Ovidiu Petre
  Marius Popa
  Mircea Popa
  Dumitru Popescu
  Gabriel Popescu
  Dan Potocianu
  Daniel Prodan
  Ionuț Rada
  Sergiu Radu
  Narcis Răducan
  Gabriel Raksi
  Gabriel Sandu
  Mircea Sandu
  Cristian Săpunaru
  Lajos Sătmăreanu
  Marian Savu
  Ion Sburlea
  Valeriu Soare
  Ion Țîrcovnicu
  Dan Topolinschi
  Bogdan Vintilă
  Marin Voinea
  Constantin Zamfir
  Dorin Zotincă

Albania
  Albert Duro
Australia
  Ryan Griffiths
  Jonathan McKain
  Wayne Srhoj
  Michael Thwaite
Bosnia and Herzegovina
  Slaviša Mitrović
Moldova
  Valeriu Andronic
Nigeria
  Abiodun Agunbiade

Notable former managers

  Roberto Landi
  Cristiano Bergodi
  Gheorghe Cristoloveanu
  Cornel Drăgușin
  Florin Halagian
  Jackie Ionescu
  Ioan Lupaș
  Viorel Mateianu
  Cosmin Olăroiu
  Titus Ozon
  Gabriel Rădulescu
  Marius Șumudică
  Walter Zenga

References

External links

 
 Club profile on UEFA's official website

Defunct football clubs in Romania
Football clubs in Bucharest
Sport in Bucharest
Association football clubs established in 1944
Association football clubs disestablished in 2009
Liga I clubs
Liga II clubs
Liga III clubs
1944 establishments in Romania
2009 disestablishments in Romania